The 1931 Tour de Hongrie was the sixth edition of the Tour de Hongrie cycle race and was held from 4 to 8 September 1931. The race started and finished in Budapest. The race was won by István Liszkay.

Route

General classification

References

1931
Tour de Hongrie
Tour de Hongrie